Idelbakovo (İźelbäk) is a rural locality (a village) and the administrative centre of Kazanbulaksky Selsoviet, Zianchurinsky District, Bashkortostan, Russia. The population was 1,283 as of 2010. There are 14 streets.

Geography 
Idelbakovo is located 84 km southeast of Isyangulovo (the district's administrative centre) by road. Yunayevo is the nearest rural locality.

References 

Rural localities in Zianchurinsky District